Daniel Sousa may refer to:

 Daniel Sousa (director) (born 1974), Portuguese short film director
 Daniel Sousa (football manager) (born 1984), Portuguese football manager
 Daniel Sousa (Marvel Cinematic Universe), fictional character from the Marvel Television series Agents of S.H.I.E.L.D.